Marja Helander (born 29 August 1965) is a Finnish urban Sámi photographer, artist and filmmaker.

Early life
Marja Helander was born in Helsinki, Finland, where she still works and lives. Helander's mother is Finnish and her father is a Sámi from Utsjoki. Even though Helander grew up in Helsinki, she spent her vacations with her father's family in Utsjoki.

Education
From 1985-1986, Helander studied at the University of Helsinki. In 1986, she started studying painting at the Liminka Art College. In 1988, she graduated from the Liminka Art School and she started studying visual arts at the Lahti Institute of Fine Arts, from which she graduated in 1992. After that she started to study photography at the University of Art and Design in Helsinki, Finland, graduating in 1999. Since Helander learned Finnish and not Sámi at home, she moved at some point to Inari to study the Sámi language and culture at the Sámi Education Institute.

Awards
 1994 – Fotofinlandia finalist
 2018 – Risto Jarva Award

External links
 Information about Helander on the Viidon sieiddit workgroup website

References 

1965 births
Living people
20th-century Finnish women artists
Finnish photographers
Finnish women photographers
Finnish filmmakers
Sámi artists
University of Helsinki alumni
21st-century Finnish women artists
20th-century women photographers
21st-century women photographers
Finnish women film directors